Abdulaziz Al-Jamaan (born 1 February 1996) is a Saudi Arabian professional footballer who plays as a winger for Al-Adalah.

Career
Abdulaziz Mohaisen Al-Jamaan is the son of former Al-Nassr player and Saudi international Mohaisen Al-Jam'an. He started his career with the youth team of Al-Hilal when his father registered him at the club in 2009. A decision which sparked controversy among the Al-Nassr fans who did not appreciate Al-Jamaan joining their local rivals. On 31 August 2016, Al-Jamaan signed a 3-year professional contract with Al-Hilal. On 14 July 2017, Al-Jamaan joined Al-Raed on a season-long loan. He made 9 appearances in all competitions and scored no goals. On 19 November 2018, Al-Jamaan left Al-Hilal and joined MS League side Al-Jabalain. On 31 January 2020, Al-Jamaan left Al-Jabalain and joined Pro League side Abha. On 2 February 2021, Al-Jamaan joined Al-Adalah. With Al-Adalah, Al-Jamaan achieved promotion to the Pro League during the 2021–22 season. On 1 July 2022, Al-Jamaan renewed his contract with Al-Adalah.

Career statistics

Club

References

External links 
 

1996 births
Living people
Saudi Arabian footballers
Al Hilal SFC players
Al-Raed FC players
Al-Jabalain FC players
Abha Club players
Al-Adalah FC players
Saudi Professional League players
Saudi First Division League players
Association football midfielders